Beitar Ironi Kiryat Gat is an Israeli football club based in Kiryat Gat. The club currently plays in Liga Bet South division.

History
The club was founded in 1970 and joined the Beitar sport association. The club started playing in Liga Dalet (Gezer District). In the 1981/1982 season the team promoted to Liga Bet. and drop out after 3 seasons. In the 1986/1987 season the team promoted again to Liga Bet. and drop out after 2 seasons.

In the 1999/2000, The team promoted two leagues in two years, and reached to Liga Alef. Over the years, The highest place that the club had reached is the sixth place Liga Alef (The Third Division).

Until 2006 there were in Kiryat Gat two football clubs: Maccabi Kiryat Gat F.C., and Beitar Kiryat Gat which played in Liga Alef. After this season, The club merged with Maccabi and Disassembled.

Re-established
In September 2016, the club Re-established. and participate in Liga Gimel South division. In the 2016/2017 season, the club finished in the second place, and stayed in Liga Gimel. A year later, the club won the Liga Gimel South and was promoted to Liga Bet.

External links
Beitar Ironi Kiryat Gat The Israel Football Association

References

 
Sport in Kiryat Gat
Kiryat Gat
Kiryat Gat
Association football clubs established in 1970
Association football clubs established in 2016
1970 establishments in Israel
2016 establishments in Israel